Private Coron D. Evans (born 1844) was an American soldier who fought in the American Civil War. Evans received the country's highest award for bravery during combat, the Medal of Honor, for his action during the Battle of Sayler's Creek in Virginia on 6 April 1865. He was honored with the award on 3 May 1865.

Biography
Evans was born in Jefferson County, Indiana in 1844. He enlisted into the 3rd Indiana Cavalry.

Medal of Honor citation

See also

List of American Civil War Medal of Honor recipients: A–F

References

1844 births
People of Indiana in the American Civil War
Union Army officers
United States Army Medal of Honor recipients
American Civil War recipients of the Medal of Honor
People from Jefferson County, Indiana
Year of death missing